Hyllus ramadanii is a jumping spider species in the genus Hyllus that lives in Tanzania. It was first described in 2000.

References

Endemic fauna of Tanzania
Fauna of Tanzania
Salticidae
Spiders described in 2000
Spiders of Africa
Taxa named by Wanda Wesołowska